Siren Records was an independent music label based in Auckland, New Zealand formed in 2000.

Goldenhorse Riverhead took the record for longest climb in the album charts to the #1 position of just under 2 years, finally reaching triple platinum status with the single Maybe Tomorrow succeeding as a top 10 hit and was crowned 2003's Most Played Song On Radio at the NZ Music Awards. Their next album Out of the Moon achieved similar success climbing quickly to double platinum. Their final album Reporter released 2008 quickly made Gold status before the band broke up in 2009.

The first Opshop album You Are Here (released 2004) achieved platinum status only after Siren released an unprecedented 8 singles and videos from the album over 4 years to establish the band a place in the industry and a meaningful fan base. 2007 saw the release of their second album Second Hand Planet which in a short time made triple platinum status. Siren released 4 singles with the first "Maybe" making Opshop the first NZ band go to the #1 position on the iTunes charts. In 2009 Siren released the band from their deal and their self promoted 2011 album "Until The End Of Time" is yet to achieve any certification.

Annabel Fay was signed to Siren from 2005 until 2011. Annabel's debut single, "Lovin' You Baby", was released to the New Zealand market in late 2006. It peaked at #9 and spent 8 weeks on the New Zealand Top 40 Singles chart. Following her second single, "Shake It Off", the album release date was in August 2007 to coincide with the release of her third single, "Strong". This self-titled album was recorded with producer Brady Blade, formerly Emmylou Harris's drummer, who also produced Brooke Fraser's debut album. Annabel Fay debuted on the Official New Zealand Top 40 Albums Chart on August 27, 2007, and peaked at #30. She earned her a Vodafone NZ Music Award nomination for Best Female Artist in 2008. Her second album, Show Me the Right Way, was released by EMI on April 11, 2011. The album's lead single, "River", received massive airplay and peaked at #10 on the New Zealand Top 40 Singles Chart. The album peaked on the Official New Zealand Top 40 Albums Chart at #8 and stayed on the chart for five weeks.

Distribution in New Zealand is through Universal.

Artists
 Goldenhorse
 Opshop
 Annabel Fay
 Ben King
 Dei Hamo

External links
 

New Zealand independent record labels